Thiazolidine is a heterocyclic organic compound with the formula (CH2)3(NH)S.  It is  a 5-membered saturated ring with a thioether group and an amine group in the 1 and 3 positions. It is a sulfur analog of oxazolidine. Thiazolidine is a colorless liquid.

Derivatives, thiazolidines, are known.  For example, the drug pioglitazone contains a thiazolidine ring. Another drug that contains a thiazolidine ring is the antibiotic penicillin.

Preparation
Thiazolidine is prepared as it was in its first reported synthesis, by the condensation of cysteamine and formaldehyde. Other thiazolidines may be synthesized by similar condensations.  A notable derivative is 4-carboxythiazolidine, derived from formaldehyde and cysteine.

Derivatives
N-Methyl-2-thiazolidinethione is an accelerator for the vulcanization of chloroprene rubbers.

Thiazolidines functionalized with carbonyls at the 2 and 4 positions, the thiazolidinediones, are drugs used in the treatment of diabetes mellitus type 2.  Rhodanine is a related bioactive species, featuring one carbonyl and one thiocarbonyl.

See also
 Thiazole
 Thiazoline

References